Bourla is a surname. Notable people with the surname include:

 Albert Bourla, businessman
 Moisis Michail Bourlas, member of the Greek WWII Resistance
 Aviad Bourla (born 1993), Israeli footballer
 Pierre Bruno Bourla (1783–1866), Belgian architect
 Bourla Theatre, theatre in Antwerp designed by Pierre